, also sometimes romanized as Kan'ō, was a Japanese era name (年号, nengō, lit. year name) of the Northern Court during the Era of Northern and Southern Courts after Jōwa and before Bunna. This period spanned the years from February 1350 through September 1352.

Nanboku-chō overview 
   
During the Meiji period, an Imperial decree dated March 3, 1911 established that the legitimate reigning monarchs of this period were the direct descendants of Emperor Go-Daigo through Emperor Go-Murakami, whose  had been established in exile in Yoshino, near Nara.

Until the end of the Edo period, the militarily superior pretender-Emperors supported by the Ashikaga shogunate had been mistakenly incorporated in Imperial chronologies despite the undisputed fact that the Imperial Regalia were not in their possession.

This illegitimate  had been established in Kyoto by Ashikaga Takauji.

Change of era
 1350, also called : The new era name was created to mark an event or series of events. The previous era ended and the new one commenced in Jōwa 6.

In this time frame, Shōhei (1346–1370) was the Southern Court equivalent nengō.

Events of the Kannō era 
 1350 (Kannō 1, 10th month): Yoshinori guarded Kyoto.
 1350 (Kannō 1): Tadayoshi, excluded from administration, turns priest;<ref name="a329">Ackroyd, Joyce. (1982) Lessons from History: The Tokushi Yoron, p.329.</ref> Tadayoshi's adopted son, Ashikaga Tadafuyu is wrongly repudiated as a rebel.
 1351 (Kannō 2):  Tadayoshi joins Southern Court, southern army takes Kyoto; truce, Takauji returns to Kyoto; Tadayoshi and Takauji reconciled; Kō no Moronao and Kō no Moroyasu are exiled.
Disagreement about the influence of Kō no Moronao diminished after death of Moronao. Tadayoshi was ordered to relocate to Kamakura. The brothers eventually reconciled before Tadayoshi's death in 1352.

Notes

References
 Ackroyd, Joyce. (1982) Lessons from History: The Tokushi Yoron. Brisbane: University of Queensland Press. 
 Mehl, Margaret. (1997). History and the State in Nineteenth-Century Japan. New York: St Martin's Press. ; OCLC 419870136
 Nussbaum, Louis Frédéric and Käthe Roth. (2005). Japan Encyclopedia. Cambridge: Harvard University Press. ; OCLC 48943301
 Thomas, Julia Adeney. (2001). Reconfiguring Modernity: Concepts of Nature in Japanese Political Ideology. Berkeley: University of California Press. ; 
 Titsingh, Isaac. (1834). Nihon Odai Ichiran''; ou,  Annales des empereurs du Japon.  Paris: Royal Asiatic Society, Oriental Translation Fund of Great Britain and Ireland. OCLC 5850691

External links
 National Diet Library, "The Japanese Calendar" -- historical overview plus illustrative images from library's collection

Japanese eras
1350s in Japan